Bandeirante, Portuguese for 'scout', may refer to:

Brazilian sports clubs
 Clube Atlético Bandeirante, a Brazilian football (soccer) club
 Bandeirante Esporte Clube, a Brazilian football (soccer) club
 Bandeirante Futebol Clube, a Brazilian football (soccer) club
 Esporte Clube Dom Pedro Bandeirante, a Brazilian football (soccer) club
 União Bandeirante Futebol Clube, a Brazilian football (soccer) club

Places in Brazil
 Bandeirantes, Mato Grosso do Sul
 Bandeirante, Santa Catarina
 Bandeirantes do Tocantins
 Bandeirantes, Paraná

Other uses
 Bandeirantes, Portuguese Brazilian colonial slavers and fortune hunters
 Embraer EMB 110 Bandeirante, a small turbo-prop passenger aircraft
 J40 Bandeirante, a version of the Toyota Land Cruiser
 Rede Bandeirantes, a broadcast television network in Brazil
 Federação de Bandeirantes do Brasil, the Girl Scouts of Brazil